Cunningham County is one of the 141 Cadastral divisions of New South Wales. It is located to the north of the Lachlan River near Condobolin.

Cunningham County was named in honour of the botanist and explorer Allan Cunningham (1791-1839).

Parishes within this county
A full list of parishes found within this county; their current LGA and mapping coordinates to the approximate centre of each location is as follows:

References

Counties of New South Wales